Bahamas Taxi Cab Union is a trade union organizing taxi drivers in the Bahamas.

The former Governor-General of The Commonwealth of The Bahamas, Clifford Darling, was at one point a cab driver, and served as both the general secretary and president of the Bahamas Taxi Cab union.

References

Transport trade unions in the Bahamas
Taxis
Road transport trade unions
Taxi drivers